David King (born 7 March 1972) is a former Australian rules footballer who played for the North Melbourne Football Club in the Australian Football League (AFL). He debuted for the Kangaroos in 1994 after being recruited from Port Melbourne Football Club at the age of 22. He went on to play 241 games and kicked 145 goals, winning premierships in 1996 and 1999.
Ranked No.1 for ‘Run Pasts’ in the AFL between 1994-2004

He represented Victoria in State of Origin on more than one occasion, including in 1998. He is notable for holding a VFL/AFL record by playing in Preliminary Finals for seven consecutive years from his debut year in 1994 to 2000.

He was twice an AFL All-Australian and retired at the end of the 2004 season. He then joined the Richmond Football Club as an assistant coach in 2005.

He is currently a commentator for Fox Footy and SEN 1116. King was awarded the Most Outstanding Television Special Comments award at the 2012 AFL Media Awards.

Legal Issues
On 19 February 2015, Australian media reported that King was being investigated by police about successful bets he made predicting the winner of the 2014 AFL Rising Star award. 

On 14 January 2019 King was fined for fleeing the scene of a car crash and drink driving in Melbourne in October 2018. 
King was driving his grey Nissan X-Trail at 12.10am on October 3 when he crashed into a stationary taxi at Southbank. Police later arrested King nearby at Crown casino, after which he blew a blood alcohol reading of 0.10 – twice the legal limit, fined $1200, had his license suspended for 10 months and had an interlock device fitted to his car

Statistics

|-
|- style="background-color: #EAEAEA"
! scope="row" style="text-align:center" | 1994
|style="text-align:center;"|
| 34 || 19 || 4 || 11 || 154 || 66 || 220 || 21 || 21 || 0.2 || 0.6 || 8.1 || 3.5 || 11.6 || 1.1 || 1.1
|-
! scope="row" style="text-align:center" | 1995
|style="text-align:center;"|
| 34 || 22 || 8 || 5 || 228 || 90 || 318 || 42 || 21 || 0.4 || 0.2 || 10.4 || 4.1 || 14.5 || 1.9 || 1.0
|- style="background-color: #EAEAEA"
| bgcolor=F0E68C | 1996# ||  
| 34 || 25 || 5 || 2 || 280 || 115 || 395 || 79 || 31 || 0.2 || 0.1 || 11.2 || 4.6 || 15.8 || 3.2 || 1.2
|-
! scope="row" style="text-align:center" | 1997
|style="text-align:center;"|
| 34 || 23 || 8 || 5 || 348 || 73 || 421 || 67 || 23 || 0.3 || 0.2 || 15.1 || 3.2 || 18.3 || 2.9 || 1.0
|- style="background-color: #EAEAEA"
! scope="row" style="text-align:center" | 1998
|style="text-align:center;"|
| 34 || 22 || 10 || 12 || 322 || 86 || 408 || 54 || 28 || 0.5 || 0.5 || 14.6 || 3.9 || 18.5 || 2.5 || 1.3
|-
| bgcolor=F0E68C | 1999# || 
| 34 || 21 || 8 || 8 || 286 || 74 || 360 || 64 || 21 || 0.4 || 0.4 || 13.6 || 3.5 || 17.1 || 3.0 || 1.0
|- style="background-color: #EAEAEA"
! scope="row" style="text-align:center" | 2000
|style="text-align:center;"|
| 34 || 25 || 27 || 11 || 399 || 105 || 504 || 92 || 50 || 1.1 || 0.4 || 16.0 || 4.2 || 20.2 || 3.7 || 2.0
|-
! scope="row" style="text-align:center" | 2001
|style="text-align:center;"|
| 34 || 19 || 19 || 11 || 291 || 99 || 390 || 64 || 28 || 1.0 || 0.6 || 15.3 || 5.2 || 20.5 || 3.4 || 1.5
|- style="background-color: #EAEAEA"
! scope="row" style="text-align:center" | 2002
|style="text-align:center;"|
| 34 || 22 || 22 || 23 || 308 || 87 || 395 || 70 || 34 || 1.0 || 1.0 || 14.0 || 4.0 || 18.0 || 3.2 || 1.5
|-
! scope="row" style="text-align:center" | 2003
|style="text-align:center;"|
| 34 || 21 || 26 || 27 || 286 || 51 || 337 || 99 || 44 || 1.2 || 1.3 || 13.6 || 2.4 || 16.0 || 4.7 || 2.1
|- style="background-color: #EAEAEA"
! scope="row" style="text-align:center" | 2004
|style="text-align:center;"|
| 34 || 22 || 8 || 9 || 271 || 65 || 336 || 94 || 37 || 0.4 || 0.4 || 12.3 || 3.0 || 15.3 || 4.3 || 1.7
|- class="sortbottom"
! colspan=3| Career
! 241
! 145
! 124
! 3173
! 911
! 4084
! 746
! 338
! 0.6
! 0.5
! 13.2
! 3.8
! 16.9
! 3.1
! 1.4
|}

References

External links

David King's profile at AustralianFootball.com

1972 births
Living people
Australian rules footballers from Victoria (Australia)
North Melbourne Football Club players
North Melbourne Football Club Premiership players
Victorian State of Origin players
Port Melbourne Football Club players
All-Australians (AFL)
Australia international rules football team players
Two-time VFL/AFL Premiership players
Australian rules football commentators